The Circus of Horrors is a British contemporary circus created by John Haze and Gerry Cottle. They were first seen performing at the Glastonbury Festival in 1995. Blending horror, black comedy and rock music with circus acts, it uses goth and steampunk imagery, and references Victorian freak shows and burlesque. They were semi-finalists on Britain's Got Talent in 2011.

History 

The Circus of Horrors was co-founded by John Haze and Gerry Cottle and debuted at the 1995 Glastonbury Festival, directed by Pierrot Bidon. Influences include Alice Cooper, Marc Bolan, Rob Zombie, Jim Rose Circus, and Archaos.

The Circus of Horrors have performed at various festivals, including Glastonbury Festival (three times), Download Festival (four times), Reading and Leeds Festivals, T in the Park, Edinburgh Fringe, Beautiful Days Festival, Isle of Wight Festival, Tartan Heart Festival in the United Kingdom, Fuji Rock Festival in Japan (twice), Wacken Festival in Germany, plus shows in the United States, Chile, Uruguay, the Netherlands, Belgium (twice), Argentina, France, Italy, Ireland, Hong Kong, Poland, Jersey, and Moscow where it created history in 2015 by becoming the first British circus ever to perform in Russia. They annually perform at The Great Dorset Steam Fair and Shocktober Fest, and tour theatres across the UK.

Regular performers include Ringmaster Doktor Haze, Hannibal Hellmurto, Anastasia IV, Captain Dan, Gary Stretch, The Mongolian Laughing Boy, Camp Dracula, The Sinister Sisters, The Deadly Divas and The Voodoo Warriors. They have also performed with many stars and celebrities including Alice Cooper, Gary Numan, Marilyn Manson, The Damned, Boy George, Cradle of Filth, Lenny Henry, Dani Behr, Gary Lineker, Robbie Williams, Yvette Fielding, Arthur Brown, Ant & Dec, Screaming Lord Sutch, and Jeremy Beadle.

The Circus Of Horrors hold numerous Guinness World Records, including the world's largest custard pie fight, most swords swallowed in one minute, 1040 vampires in the same place at the same time, greatest weight lifted by the hair, and the largest human mobile which contained 16 men, including Dr Haze, suspended from a crane 150 ft above the River Thames.

In 2011, The Circus of Horrors appeared on Britain's Got Talent and became the only circus act to ever reach the finals of the show. They were the first circus to perform in London's West End in over 100 years and were the only circus to perform in a single venue in London (the Roundhouse) for 24 weeks, (previous record was 17 weeks).

Tours 

10th Anniversary Tour (2004–2005)
Undead & Alive (2005–2006)
Evilution (2006–2007)
The Asylum (2007–2008)
The Apocalypse in the Asylum (2008–2009)
 The Day of the Dead (2009–2010)
4 Chapters From Hell (2010–2011)
The Ventriloquist (2011–2012)
London After Midnight (2013–2014)
 The Night of the Zombie (2014–2015)
Welcome to Carnevil (2015–2016)
 The Never-ending Nightmare (2016–2017)
 Voodoo (2017–2018)
Psycho Asylum (2018–2019)
25th Anniversary Tour (2019–2020)
Revamped & Rocking (2020–2021)
The Witch (2022)
Haunted Fairground (2023)

Filmography

Music video credits 

Cradle of Filth – "Born in a Burial Gown" (2001)

Television credits 

Dani Dares (1997)
Royal Command Variety Performance (1998)
London's Burning (1999)
Don't Try This at Home (1999–2001)
Record Breakers (2001)
So Graham Norton (2002)
Richard & Judy (2003)
Ant & Dec's Saturday Night Takeaway (2003)
Get Your Act Together with Harvey Goldsmith (2007)
This Morning (2008)
Bizarre ER (2008)
Ross Lee's Ghoulies (2009)
Guinness World Records Smashed (2009)
The Slammer (2010)
Britain's Got Talent (2011)
Daybreak (2011)
Fairground Attractions (2011)
Das Supertalent (2012)
Fake Reaction (2013)
Operation Ouch! (2013)
The One Show (2014)
Bodyshockers (2015)
The Nolan Show (2016)
Judge Rinder (2018)
Apocalypse Wow (2021)

References

External links 

 https://www.youtube.com/watch?v=pwfRpTRZ4m8

Circuses
Britain's Got Talent contestants
1995 establishments in England